The Repository Support Project (RSP) was a 7-year Jisc funded project set up to support and develop the UK network of institutional repositories.  It was originally funded through to March 2009, but was then extended to run until early 2011. The project ceased on 31 July 2013. 

Original project partners were:
 SHERPA (organisation), University of Nottingham (lead)
 Aberystwyth University
 UKOLN, University of Bath
 Digital Curation Centre (DCC), University of Bath
 University of Southampton

The project aimed to develop a network of interoperable repositories for all kinds of research outputs and data across the UK.

References

External links
 RSP Website
 SHERPA Website

Educational projects
Information technology organisations based in the United Kingdom
Jisc